The Tennessee PGA Championship is a golf tournament that is the championship of the Tennessee section of the PGA of America. Gibby Gilbert (three-time PGA Tour winner) and Joe Campbell (three-time PGA tour winner) share the record for most wins with five each.  Other PGA tour winners who were also victorious in the Tennessee PGA Championship include Mason Rudolph (five-time PGA tour winner) and Bert Weaver.

Winners 

 2022 Casey Flenniken
 2021 Loren Personett
 2020 Johan Kok
 2019 Johan Kok
 2018 Johan Kok
 2017 Johan Kok
 2016 Oliver Peacock
 2015 Loren Personett
 2014 Scott Moran
 2013 Kelvin Burgin
 2012 Scott Moran
 2011 Audie Johnson
 2010 Kip Henley
 2009 Scott Moran
 2008 Kelvin Burgin
 2007 Kelvin Burgin
 2006 Kelvin Burgin
 2005 Kip Henley
 2004 Rob Hessing
 2003 Loren Personett
 2002 Bob Boyle
 2001 Bob Boyle
 2000 Sam Adams
 1999 Randy Helton
 1998 Bobby Bray
 1997 Art Whaley
 1996 Art Whaley
 1995 Don Jones
 1994 Kip Henley
 1993 Kip Henley
 1992 Walt Chapman
 1991 Randy Helton
 1990 Gibby Gilbert
 1989 Bobby Bray
 1988 Gibby Gilbert
 1987 Gibby Gilbert
 1986 Gibby Gilbert
 1985 Gary Robinson
 1984 Waddy Stokes
 1983 Gary Robinson
 1982 Bobby Bray
 1981 Mike Nixon
 1980 Mike Nixon
 1979 Gibby Gilbert
 1978 Jimmy Paschal
 1977 Greg Powers
 1976 Gary Robinson
 1975 Bert Weaver
 1974 Greg Powers
 1973 Bob Wolfe
 1972 Joe Campbell
 1971 Larry Gilbert
 1970 Joe Campbell
 1969 Mason Rudolph
 1968 Carroll Armstrong
 1967 Joe Campbell
 1966 Joe Campbell
 1965 Joe Campbell

References

External links 
PGA of America – Tennessee section
Tennessee Section Professional Championship: Past Champions

Golf in Tennessee
PGA of America sectional tournaments
Recurring sporting events established in 1965
1965 establishments in Tennessee